New Hampshire Route 119 (NH 119) is a state highway in the U.S. state of New Hampshire. NH 119 heads east  to the Massachusetts state line in New Ipswich, where the highway continues as Massachusetts Route 119. The state highway is the main east–west highway of southern Cheshire County, where it connects the towns of Hinsdale, Winchester, Richmond, Fitzwilliam, and Rindge.

Route description

NH 119 begins at the Vermont state line at the west bank of the Connecticut River. The highway continues west as VT 119 (Bridge Street) into downtown Brattleboro, where the highway has a grade crossing of the New England Central Railroad before its terminal intersection, from which US 5 heads west on Canal Street and north on Main Street, and VT 142 heads south as Vernon Street. An Amtrak station for the Vermonter between St. Albans, Vermont, and Washington, D.C., is located here.

NH 119 crosses the main channel of the Connecticut River on a truss bridge, then heads southeast along an unnamed island and crosses another channel to reach the east bank of the river. The highway, which is named Brattleboro Road, follows the east bank of the river southeast along the flank of Wantastiquet Mountain through the town of Hinsdale. West of the center of town, NH 119 veers east away from the Connecticut River and becomes the town's Main Street. While passing through downtown, the highway has a concurrency with NH 63, which heads south as Northfield Road and north as Chesterfield Road.

NH 119 parallels the Ashuelot River east from the town center along Canal Street and becomes Ashuelot Main Street on entering the town of Winchester. East of the village of Ashuelot, which contains a namesake covered bridge, the highway continues as Hinsdale Road to the town center of Winchester. There, the highway crosses the river and has a four-leg intersection with NH 10 (Manning Hill Road) and NH 78 (Warwick Road). NH 119 and NH 10 head north across Mirey Brook as Main Street to the center of town, where NH 10 continues straight on Keene Road and NH 119 turns east onto Richmond Street. The highway crosses several hills and ridges in the town of Richmond, in the center of which the highway intersects NH 32 (Athol Road/Old Homestead Highway). The highway is named Winchester Road and Fitzwilliam Road west and east of the town center, respectively.

NH 119 enters the town of Fitzwilliam, where the highway passes to the south of Rhododendron State Park, which surrounds Little Monadnock Mountain. The highway has a curvaceous path through the town that includes two right-angle turns west of the town center, where the highway intersects NH 12. NH 119 continues east into the town of Rindge. The route passes to the south of Franklin Pierce University before having a junction with US 202. NH 119 continues southeast, passing the town center of Rindge to the northeast and the Wapack Wilderness, the site of several monadnocks in the Wapack Range, including Pratt Mountain. The state highway cuts across the extreme southwest corner of the town of New Ipswich in Hillsborough County before reaching its eastern terminus at the Massachusetts state line. The highway continues southeast into the town of Ashburnham as Massachusetts Route 119 (Rindge State Road).

Major intersections

References

External links

 New Hampshire State Route 119 on Flickr

119
Transportation in Cheshire County, New Hampshire
Transportation in Hillsborough County, New Hampshire